Roger Keith Midgley (23 November 1924 – 12 December 2019) was a British field hockey player who competed in the 1952 Summer Olympics. He was a member of the British field hockey team, which won the bronze medal. He played all three matches as back.

References

External links
 
Roger Midgley's profile at databaseOlympics

1924 births
2019 deaths
British male field hockey players
Olympic field hockey players of Great Britain
Field hockey players at the 1952 Summer Olympics
Olympic bronze medallists for Great Britain
Olympic medalists in field hockey
Medalists at the 1952 Summer Olympics